Scopula penricei is a moth of the  family Geometridae. It is found in Angola.

References

Endemic fauna of Angola
Moths described in 1920
penricei
Insects of Angola
Moths of Africa